Pimelodella kronei is a species of three-barbeled catfish endemic to Brazil. Discovered by the German naturalist Sigismund Ernst Richard Krone, it was the first troglobitic fish described in Brazil, but several others have been described later.

Description
The Pimelodella kronei is an endemic troglobitic species, so exclusively subterranean, found in cave streams along the Betari River basin, a tributary of the upper Ribeira de Iguape River. The species is adapted to food scarcity typical of the underground and seems to be in the midst of a process of loss of cryptobiotic habits - the blind catfish are little or no photophobic and spend a lot of time actively exploring the whole environment, not only the bottom but also the water column and the surface, and as other troglobitic fish, is oriented toward any stimulus, apparently interpreting them as a sign of food.

It is highly susceptible to environmental fluctuations, depending on the relative stability of the underground, and with low rates of reproduction and growth (it grows less than 1 mm a month, but has high longevity of 15 to 20 years) and therefore it presents low capacity to replace the population losses due to natural or anthropogenic causes. The increase in activity and the loss of these defense mechanisms makes it a very vulnerable species.  This fish reaches a length of  SL.

See also
 List of caves in Brazil

Sources

References

External links
Data for Pimelodella kronei — at Fishbase.us

K
Catfish of South America
Endemic fauna of Brazil
Freshwater fish of Brazil
Cave fish
Environment of Paraná (state)
Environment of São Paulo (state)
Fish described in 1907
Taxa named by Alípio de Miranda-Ribeiro
Taxonomy articles created by Polbot